Arthur Ernest Guinness (2 November 1876 – 22 March 1949) was an Irish engineer and a senior member of the Guinness family. He usually went by the name of Ernest.

Family
Ernest was the second son of brewing magnate Edward Guinness, 1st Earl of Iveagh and his wife Adelaide. On 15 July 1903 he married Marie Clothilde Russell, the daughter of Sir George Russell, 4th Baronet, and his wife Charlotte. Ernest and Marie Clothilde had:

 Aileen (1904–99), who married the Hon. Brinsley Plunket;
 Maureen (1907–98), the wife of Basil Hamilton-Temple-Blackwood, 4th Marquess of Dufferin and Ava, whose children included the author Caroline Blackwood;
 Oonagh (1910–95), the wife of the Hon. Philip Kindersley, and then of Dominick Browne, 4th Baron Oranmore and Browne, whose children included Garech Browne and Tara Browne.

Career
Ernest was seen as the modernising technical expert among the Guinness family directors at Guinness from 1900 to the 1930s, until he was seriously injured in a motorboat accident at sea in Killary lough. A keen motorist, he bought a custom-built V16 Cadillac, from Mayfair dealer Lendrum & Hartman Limited which was exhibited at 1930 London Motor Show. In 1934 he was involved in building a new brewery at Park Royal in the suburbs of London. In 1923 he bought the "Fantome II", a 3-masted barque. 

He was educated at Trinity College, Cambridge, served with the London Rifle Brigade and as a Deputy Lieutenant and a Justice of the peace for County Dublin.

Notes

External links
 

1876 births
1949 deaths
Alumni of Trinity College, Cambridge
Ernest
Engineers from Dublin (city)
Irish brewers
Younger sons of earls
London Rifle Brigade officers